The following list is a discography of production by Scoop DeVille, an American hip hop record producer from Los Angeles, California. It includes a list of songs produced, co-produced and remixed by year, artist, album and title.

Singles produced

2005

Frost - Welcome to Frost Angeles
 02. "So Kold"
 03. "When The Lights Go Down" (feat. Genovese)
 04. "The Kaper" (feat. Jay Tee & Cameosis)
 05. "It's Tha Kid"
 06. "Can Not Fuck Wit These Gangsta's" (feat. Bad Boy)
 07. "It Ain't The Same"
 08. "Shake Them Ho's"
 09. "Til The Morning Light" (feat. Krystál)
 10. "Los Borachos" (feat. Vato Loco Tone)
 11. "We Run Shit"
 12. "Think We Playin'" (feat. Bad Boy, Kree, Ryu & Tonic)
 13. "My Reincarnation"

Fort Minor - Fort Minor: We Major
 10. "Get It" (Styles of Beyond)
 12. "Respect 4 Grandma" (feat. Styles of Beyond and Celph Titled)

2007

Styles of Beyond - Razor Tag
 17. "Kill 'em In the Face" (feat. Scoop DeVille)

Baby Bash - Cyclone
 06. "Mamacita" (feat. Marcos Hernandez)
  Sample Credit: "Voyage to Atlantis" by The Isley Brothers

2008

Snoop Dogg - Ego Trippin'

 01. "A Word Witchya! (Intro)"
  Sample Credit: "Distant Lover" by Marvin Gaye 
 07. "Life of da Party" (feat. Too Short & Mistah F.A.B.)
 17. "Ridin' In My Chevy"
 18. "Those Gurlz" (Produced with Teddy Riley & DJ Quik)
  Sample Credit: "Too Much Heaven" by Bee Gees

Murs - Murs for President
 04. "The Science" (Produced with DJ Quik)
 05. "Can It Be (Half a Million Dollars and 18 Months Later)"
  Sample Credit: "I Wanna Be Where You Are" by Michael Jackson

2009

B-Real - Smoke N Mirrors
 03. "Don't Ya Dare Laugh" (feat. Young De & Xzibit)

Get Busy Committee - Uzi Does It
 Entire album (along with Apathy)

Playaz Circle - Flight 360: The Takeoff
 03. "Quit Flossin'" (feat. The Casey Boys of Jagged Edge) (Produced with Get Busy Committee)

Snoop Dogg - Malice n Wonderland
 02. "I Wanna Rock"
  Sample Credit: "It Takes Two" by Rob Base and DJ E-Z Rock 
 05. "Different Languages" (feat. Jazmine Sullivan) (Produced with Teddy Riley & PMG)

2010

Snoop Dogg - More Malice
 01. "I Wanna Rock (The Kings G-Mix)" (feat. Jay-Z)
  Sample Credit: "It Takes Two" by Rob Base and DJ E-Z Rock

Game - The R.E.D. Room
 02. "Ha Ha" (feat. Nipsey Hussle)
  Sample Credit: "Back to Life (However Do You Want Me)" by Soul II Soul 
 08. "Gangs of New York" (feat. Jadakiss & Jim Jones)
 18. "Slangin' Rocks"

Fat Joe - The Darkside Vol. 1
 06. "(Ha Ha) Slow Down" (feat. Young Jeezy)
  Sample Credit: "Back to Life (However Do You Want Me)" by Soul II Soul 
 08. "No Problems" (feat. Rico Love)
  Sample Credit: "Flash's Theme" by Queen 
  Sample Credit: "Terminator X to the Edge of Panic" by Public Enemy

Das Racist - Sit Down, Man
 18. "Sit Down, Man" (feat. El-P)

Bishop Lamont - The Shawshank Redemption/Angola 3
 13. "Anything" (feat. Ryu & Mike Ant)

Snoop Dogg - New Year's Eve (song)
 01. "New Year's Eve" (feat. Marty James)

2011

Snoop Dogg - Doggumentary
 11. "El Lay" (feat. Marty James)
 13. "This Weed Iz Mine" (feat. Wiz Khalifa)
  Sample Credit: "This Beat Is Mine" by Vicky D

Clyde Carson
 "Somethin' To Speak About" (featuring Game)

Tony Yayo
 Haters (featuring 50 Cent, Shawty Lo & Roscoe Dash)

Demrick aka Young De x Scoop DeVille - Neva LOOK Back!
 01. Neva LOOK Back!
 02. Ain’t Saying Nothing
 03. What’s Good?! (feat. Brevi)
 04. People Keep Telling Me (feat. Kurupt)
 05. Ready 2 Go (feat. Scoop DeVille, Xzibit & Brevi)
 06. RUN (feat. Scoop DeVille)
 07. What’s Good?! (Remix) (feat. Scoop DeVille & Cliquo Nico)

50 Cent - The Big 10
 07. "Wait Until Tonight"

2012

Kendrick Lamar - good kid, m.A.A.d city
 06. "Poetic Justice" (featuring Drake)
 Sample: "Any Time, Any Place" by Janet Jackson
 13. "The Recipe" (featuring Dr. Dre)
  Sample: "Meet the Frownies" by Twin Sister

2013

Tech N9ne - Something Else 
16. "Meant to Happen"  (featuring Scoop DeVille)

Jim Jones 
00. "Greenlight"  (featuring Swizz Beatz)

MiBBs - FREEBASS

Jonwayne - Rap Album One
 04. The Come Up Pt. 1 (featuring Scoop DeVille)
 10. Black Magic

2014

Vince Staples - Shyne Coldchain Vol. 2
 07. "Nate" (featuring James Fauntleroy)

Fatima - Yellow Memories
 07. "Ridin Round"

Busta Rhymes - Extinction Level Event 2: The Wrath of God (Reloaded)
 "Calm Down" (featuring Eminem)

Nipsey Hussle - Mailbox Money
 06. "Only A Case" (featuring G.I. Joe & Conrad)

2015

The Legalizers (Paul Wall & Baby Bash) - The Legalizers: Legalize or Die, Vol. 1

 03. Cherry Pie & OG Kush

Scoop DeVille & Demrick - Loud Pack: Extracts

 01. The Escape (feat. Stori)
 02. All Time High
 03. N Doe Smoke (feat. Asher Roth)
 04. Blowing Money Fast (feat. B-Real & Berner)
 05. Reefer Madness
 06. Kush Cloud (feat. Paul Wall)
 07. I'm Smoked Out
 08. No Tint
 09. Relieve
 10. Zone
 11. Murda Murda (feat. Berner & Paul Wall)

Paul Wall - Slab God
 01. "Swangin' In The Rain"

Raekwon - Fly International Luxurious Art
 07. "1,2 1,2" (featuring Snoop Dogg)

Summer Cocktail
 01. Blitzkrieg Bop - WolfBlitzBop
 02. Tin Man - Tin n Juice
 03. Shout - Wolf Fears
 04. This Charming Man - Vogue And Vodka
 05. Take It Easy - Disco Darjeeling
 06. I Get Around - Sex On The Beach
 07. Corcovado - Lobo Lemonade

Watercolour Werewolf
 Tides
 Survival
 DontJuly

LBC Movement & DJ Drama - Beach City
 01. Back Up (featuring Snoop Dogg)

2016

Demrick - Collect Call
 03. Watch This (feat. Lil Debbie)
 05. Freak Show
 06. Pocket Full Of Green
 09. Broke Down The Walls

References

Hip hop discographies
Production discographies
Discographies of American artists